Levitation, Levitate, or Levitating may refer to:

Concepts
Levitation (physics), the process by which an object is suspended against gravity, in a stable position without solid physical contact
Levitation (paranormal), the claimed paranormal phenomenon of levitation, occurring without any scientific explanation
Levitation (illusion), an illusion where a magician levitates somebody or something
Levitation of saints, a mystical phenomenon attributed to some saints

Game
Party levitation, aka "Light as a feather, stiff as a board"

Film
Levitation (film), a 1997 Scott D. Goldstein film

Music
Levitation (band), an English psychedelic band, 1990–1994
Levitation (festival), an annual psychedelic music festival founded in 2008

Albums
Levitation (Hawkwind album)
Levitation (Flamingods album)
Levitate (Bruce Hornsby album)
Levitate (The Fall album)

Songs
"Levitating" (song), by Dua Lipa
"Levitate" (Hadouken! song)
"Levitate" (Hollywood Undead song)
"Levitation", song by Circa Zero from Circus Hero
"The Levitated", song by Scale the Summit from The Collective
"Levitate", song by Imagine Dragons from the film Passengers
"Levitate", song by Imelda May from Life Love Flesh Blood
"Levitate", song by Opshop from You Are Here
"Levitate" (Twenty One Pilots song)
"untitled 07  levitate", song by Kendrick Lamar

See also